Otoglossum is a genus of flowering plants from the orchid family, Orchidaceae, native to South America and Central America.

Description
They are plants of ovoid pseudobulbs spaced in long, along a creeping or ascending upward rhizomes, with thick and tanned leathery leaves. The inflorescence is axillary, racemosa, erect, starting from the sheaths of the pseudobulbs, racemous, erect, with many rather large and wavy or curly, rounded flowers.

The petals and sepals have similar shapes and sizes, with very frizzy, oval, large margins, somewhat concave.  The lip is inserted at the base of the column. The spine is short, sometimes with dorsal calluses. The spine is short, apodes, sometimes with dorsal calluses before the stigmatic cavity, small wings or auricles, and terminal anther somewhat inserted under the terminal margins of the spine.

Taxonomy
In 2001 Mark W. Chase and Norris Williams subordinated the Oncidium section Serpentia to Otoglossum. The species in this section, Oncidium serpens, Oncidium sanctipauli, Oncidium harlingii and Oncidium globuliferum, have few and widely spaced flowers at first glance, very similar to those of Oncidium varicosum, long repeating rhizomes like those of Rodriguezia, show frequent sprouting of new plants in the nodules of ancient floral stems, and morphologically have little in common with Otoglossum other than the scandal habit.

Species

Distribution
Otoglossum, according to its new definition already expanded to include the aforementioned section of Oncidium, then groups about thirteen epiphytic species, occasionally terrestrial, in rule of scandal growth, that inhabit humid, fresh and cold mountainous areas from Costa Rica to Peru until the altitude of three thousand meters, over trees or rocky escarpments. Three species registered for Brazil, two belonging to the old section of Odontoglossum and one to Oncidium.

See also
 List of Orchidaceae genera

References

Further reading
 Berg Pana, H. 2005. Handbuch der Orchideen-Namen. Dictionary of Orchid Names. Dizionario dei nomi delle orchidee. Ulmer, Stuttgart

External links

Oncidiinae genera
Oncidiinae